Zemina (Korean: 재미나, originally 제미나) was a South Korean software maker brand of Saehan Trading (Korean: 새한 상사) founded in 1981. They primarily made games for the Daewoo Zemmix, but because it was an MSX computer made to look and be played like a game console, they work on other MSX computers as well. Although many of them were copies of other games, like Super Boy I (based on Super Mario Bros.), they also produced some more original ones in their later years.

Korea did not have a copyright law for computer programs until July 1987. Because of that, many companies, including Zemina, sold unauthorized copies of foreign titles with their own copyright hacked in. Even after that, the new law protected only the program code, not the intellectual property as a whole, so a lot of their "own" games were ports of famous Japanese games.

Most of their titles were converted to the Master System as well. In 1992, they engaged in developing exclusive games for the Master System and Famicom consoles, but not all of them were released.

They even released Nemesis 3: The Eve of Destruction under official license from Konami under the title Salamander II - all the while still selling multi game cartridges full of unlicensed copies of older Konami games.

Zemina games

List of clones

List of original games

Note 1: The clone game Block Hole is also known as Sagak-ui Bimil.Note 2: Other releases that are merely hacks of Japanese games with Zemina's logo are not listed here.

Hardware
Zemina also made hardware for the Zemmix. These include:
 A Cartridge port divider
 The Zemina Music Box
 An MSX2 Upgrade Kit
 A Zemmix PC card
MSX RAM expansion cards
 A 'Family Card' that allows the user to play Famicom games on the Zemmix

References

External links
 List of Zemina Games
 Zemina at Sega Retro

Defunct video game companies of South Korea
Software companies of South Korea